Desulfotomaculum geothermicum is a thermophilic, fatty acid-degrading, sulfate-reducing bacterium. The species was first isolated from a hot spring in Beppu, Japan, in 1992 and was later characterized in detail.

Desulfotomaculum geothermicum is of interest to scientists because of its ability to degrade organic matter and produce methane, a potent greenhouse gas. The bacteria play an important role in the global carbon cycle and are thought to contribute to the carbon balance in hot springs and other geothermal environments. Additionally, the enzymes produced by Desulfotomaculum geothermicum are of interest for biotechnological applications, such as the production of biofuels and the removal of sulfates from industrial wastewater.

References

Further reading
Anandkumar, Balakrishnan, et al. "Effect of thermophilic sulphate-reducing bacteria (Desulfotomaculum geothermicum) isolated from Indian petroleum refinery on the corrosion of mild steel." Current Science (00113891) 97.3 (2009).
Adams, Michael W., et al., eds. Biochemistry and physiology of anaerobic bacteria. Springer, 2003.

External links
LPSN

Type strain of Desulfotomaculum geothermicum at BacDive -  the Bacterial Diversity Metadatabase

Peptococcaceae